Unterkirnach is a municipality in the district of Schwarzwald-Baar in Baden-Württemberg in Germany, situated in the Black Forest and 40 km east of Freiburg.

References

Schwarzwald-Baar-Kreis